The prix Paul-Langevin is a prize created in 1956 and named in honor of Paul Langevin. It has been awarded each year since 1957 by the Société française de physique (SFP).  The prize honors French physicists for work in theoretical physics.

Recipients

 1957 Yves Ayant
 1958 Jacques Winter
 1959 Roland Omnès
 1960 Philippe Nozières
 1961 Cyrano de Dominicis
 1962 Jacques Villain
 1963 Claude Cohen-Tannoudji
 1964 Marcel Froissart
 1965 Robert Arvieu
 1966 Roger Balian
 1967 Jean Lascoux
 1968 Émile Daniel
 1969 Jean Ginibre
 1970 Daniel Bessis
 1971 Loup Verlet
 1972 Claude Itzykson
 1973 André Neveu
 1974 Édouard Brézin
 1975 Dominique Vautherin
 1976 Gérard Toulouse
 1977 Jean Zinn-Justin
 1978 Jean Iliopoulos
 1979 Richard Schaeffer
 1980 Roland Seneor and Jacques Magnen
 1981 Yves Pomeau
 1982 Pierre Fayet
 1983 Serge Aubry
 1984 Thibault Damour
 1985 Mannque Rho
 1986 Bernard Julia
 1987 Bernard Souillard
 1988 Paul Manneville
 1989 Jean Bellissard
 1990 Pierre Coullet
 1991 Jean-Bernard Zuber
 1992 Rémi Mosseri
 1993 Jean-François Joanny
 1994 Dominique Escande
 1995 Costas Kounnas
 1996 Vincent Hakim
 1997 Patrick Mora
 1998 Denis Bernard
 1999 Pierre Binétruy
 2000 Jean-Louis Barrat
 2001 Vincent Pasquier
 2002 Leticia Cugliandolo and Jorge Kurchan
 2004 Bart Van Tiggelen
 2005 Satya Majumdar
 2008 Rémi Monasson
 2009 Alain Barrat
 2010 Jean-Philippe Uzan
 2015 François Gelis and Ubirajara van Kolck
 2016 Silke Biermann and Jesper Jacobsen
 2017 Olivier Bénichou and Raphaël Voituriez

References

French science and technology awards
Physics awards
Awards established in 1956